Sirsa is a district in the Haryana State of India. Total area of Sirsa is 4,277 km including 4,218.02 km rural area and 58.98 km urban area. Sirsa has a population of 12,95,189 peoples. There are 2,46,571 houses in the district.
The Sirsa district is further divided in to 4 Tehsils for administrative purposes.

List of villages in Sirsa

 Ahamadpur
 Alanoor
 Ali Mohammad
 Alikan
 Alipur Titu Khera
 Anandgarh
 Arnian Wali
 Bada Gudha
 Baguwali
 Bhuna
 Bajekan
 Bakarianwali
 Ban Sudhar
 Baruwali Doem
 Baruwali I
 Bhadra
 Bhagsar
 Bhamboor
 Bhangu
 Bharokhan
 Bhavdin
 Bhiwan
 Bhudha Bhana
 Biruwala Gudha
 Brasari
 Buppa
 Burj Bhangu
 Burj Karamgarh
 Chadiwal
 Chaharwala
 Chakkan
 Chak Arian
 Chak Jiwa
 Chak Quasaban
 Chak Suchan
 Chakbani
 Chakerian
 Chamal
 Chattar Garh
 Chauburja
 Chhatrian
 Dadu
 Darban Kalan
 Darbi
 Daulatpur Khera
 Desu Jodha
 Desu Khurd
 Desu Malkana
 Dhaban
 Dharampura
 Dhingtania
 Dhookara
 Ding
 Dogranwali
 Faggu
 Farwain
 Fatehpur Niamatkhan
 Gadli
 Gadrana
 Ganja Rupana
 Ghoranwali
 Gindran
 Gidranwali
 Gigorani
 Gudia Khera
 Gusaiana
 Handi Khera
 Hanjira
 Jamal
 Jasania
 Jhiri
 Jhopra
 Jhorar Nali
 Jhorar Rohi
 Jalalana
 Jodhkan
 Jogiwala
 Jorian
 Kagdana
 Kalanwali Rural
 Kamal
 Kanganpur
 Kanwarpura
 Karamgarh
 Kariwala
 kashi ka bass
 Kasan Khera
 Keharwala
 Kelnian
 Keshopura
 Kewal
 Khai Shergarh
 Khaja Khera
 Kharian
 Khatranwa
 Khairpur
 Kheowali
 Kherekan
 Kheri

 Khuyian Nepalpur
 Kirar Kot
 Kotli
 Kukar Thana
 Kumharia
 Kurangan Wali
 Kusambi
 Kutiana
 Lahenge Wala
 Lakarwali
 Liwal Wali
 Ludesar
 Madho Singhana
 Makho Soran
 Malari
 Malekan
 Malewala
 Manak Diwan
 Mangala
 Mattar
 Mauja Khera
 Maujdin
 Mirpur
 Mitthi Sureran 
 Mochiwali
 Modia Khera
 Mohamadpur Salarpur
 Moriwala
 Musahab Wala
 Nagoki
 Naharanwali
 Nahrana
 Narain Khera
 Narel Khera
 Nathusari Kalan
 Nathusari Khurd
 Nattar
 Nezadela Kalan
 Nezadela Khurd
 Nezia Khera
 Nirwan
 Odhan
 Pacca
 pathargarh 
 Panjmala
 Panjuana
 Panniwala Mota
 Patli Dabar
 Phoolkan
 Raguana
 Raipur
 Rajpura Sani
 Ram Nagaria
 Rampura
 Rampura Bagrian
 Rampura Bisnoian
 Rampura Dhilanwala
 Randhawa
 Ranga
 Rangri Khera
 Rasulpur Split Vill
 Risalia Khera
 Rohan
 Roharan Wali
 Rori
 Rupana Urf Darban Khurd
 Rupawas
 Saharan
 Sahuwala I
 Sahuwala Ii
 Sanghar Sarishta
 Sawaipur
 Shahidan Wali
 Shahpur Begu
 Shahpuria
 Shakar Khera
 Shakar Mandori
 Shamshabad
 Shekhupuria
 Sarsaiya

 Sikanderpur
 Singhpura
 Sirsa
 Subewala Khera
 Suchan
 Sukhchain
 Surtia
 Tajia Khera
 Takhatmal
 Tarkan Wali
 Taruana
 Tehri Baba Sawan Singh
 Thiraj
 Tilokewala
 Vaidwala

List of villages in Rania Tehsil

 Abholi
 Abut Garh
 Bacher
 Bahia
 Balasar
 Bani
 Bharolan Wali
 Bhoona
 Bukhara Khera
 Chakkan
 Darewala
 Dhani Satnam Singh
 Dhani Bhagwan Singh
 Dhanoor
 Dhottar
 Dhudian Wali
 Fatehpuria
 Ferozabad
 Ghoranwali
 Gindran
 Haripura
 Harni Khurd
 Jiwan Nagar
 Jodh Puria
 Kariwali
 Keharwala
 Khaja Khera
 Kharian
 Kussar
 Mamer Khera
 Mangalia
 Mattuwala
 Mehna Khera
 Mohamad Puria
 Mohranwali
 Naiwala
 Nakora
 Nanuana
 Nathohar
 Nigrana
 Ottu
 Peer Khera
 Rampur Theri
 Rania
 Sadewala
 Sainpal
 Sultanpuria
Fatehpuriya Niyamat khan

List of villages in Dabwali Tehsil

1. Abub Shahar Split Vill 
2. Ahmadpur Darewala
3. Alika
4. Asa Khera
5. Asir
6. Banwala
7. Bharu Khera
8. Bijuwali
9. Chakjalu
10. Chatha
11. Chormar Khera
12. Chutala
13. Dabwali
14. Desu Jodha
15. Dewan Khera
16. Faridpur
17. Ganga
18. Ghukanwali
19. Giddar Khera
20. Gobindgarh
21. Godeka
22. Goria Wala
23. Habuana
24. Hassu
25. Jagmalwali
26. Jandwal Jattan
27. Jandwala Bishnoian
28. Jhuti Khera
29. Joge Wala
30. Jottanwali
31. Kaluana
32. Khokhar
33. Khuyan Malkhana
34. Kingra
35. Lakhuana
36. Lambi
37. Lohgarh
38. Makha
39. Malakpur
40. Mangiana
41. Masitan
42. Matdadu
43. Maujgarh
44. Mithri, Sirsa
45. Modi
46. Moonanwali
47. Nai Dabwali
48. Naurang
49. New Rajpura
50. Nillanwali
51. Nuhiyan Wali
52. Odhan
53. Pana
54. Panniwala Moreka
55. Panniwala Ruldu
56. Phullo
57. Pipli
58. Rajpura
59. Ramgarh
60. Ramnagar
61. Rampura Bishnoian
62. Ratta Khera
63. Risalia Khera
64. Sakta Khera
65. Salam Khera
66. Sanwant Khera
67. Shergarh
68. Sukheranwala
69. Tappi
70. Teja Khera
71. Tigri

 Kumbhthal
 Kuta Budh
 Mamera
 Mehna Khera
 Mirzapur
 Mithanpur
 Mithi Surera
 Moju Khera
 Mosli
 Neemla
 Patti Kirpal
 Phorka
 Ratta Khera
 Shekhu Khera
 Talwara Khurd 
 Thobaria
 Umedpura

References

Haryana-related lists
Sirsa District
Sirsa District